Brinsley is both a given name and a surname. Notable people with the name include:

Given name:
 Brinsley Butler, 2nd Earl of Lanesborough (18th century), Grand Master of the Freemasons in Ireland
 Brinsley Forde (born 1952), Guyanese musician
 Brinsley Le Poer Trench, 8th Earl of Clancarty (1911-1995), prominent ufologist
 Brinsley MacNamara (1890-1963), Irish novelist
 Brinsley Schwarz (musician) (born 1947), English guitarist and rock musician
 Edmund Brinsley Teesdale (1915-1997), Colonial Secretary of Hong Kong
 Richard Brinsley Knowles (1820-1882), British journalist
 Richard Brinsley Sheridan (1751-1816), Irish playwright and Whig statesman

Surname:
 Frank Brinsley (born 1971), American radio personality
 Ismaaiyl Brinsley, suspect in the 2014 killings of NYPD officers